The 7th Annual Shorty Awards was hosted by comedian Rachel Dratch and took place on April 20, 2015 at The Times Center in NYC. The Real-Time Academy, the judging body of the Shortys, tripled in size for the 7th annual Awards and included Alton Brown, Mamrie Hart, Nikki Glaser, OK Go, The Fine Bros, Debbie Sterling, Dan Savage, Deena Varshavskaya and Palmer Luckey. Panic! at the Disco was the musical guest at the ceremony. On-stage presenters included Kevin Jonas, Bill Nye, Bella Thorne, Wyclef Jean, Emily Kinney and Tyler Oakley.

Awards

Winners by category

Arts and Entertainment

Creative and design

News and Media

Tech and Innovation

Global Issues

Special Award

Seventh Annual Brand & Organization Winners by category

By Industry

By Platform

By Campaign

Innovative Technology

Content and Media

Prestige Awards

References 

Shorty Awards
2015 in Internet culture